G. is a 1972 novel by John Berger, set in pre-First World War Europe, and its protagonist, named "G.", is a Don Juan or Casanova-like lover of women who gradually comes to political consciousness after misadventures across the continent. Berger's experimental, non-linear narrative novel won both the James Tait Black Memorial Prize for fiction and the Booker Prize. At the Booker Prize ceremony Berger criticized the sponsor Booker-McConnall for exploiting trade in the Caribbean for the past 130 years. Berger also  gave half of the prize money to the British Black Panther movement.

References

1972 British novels
Booker Prize-winning works
Weidenfeld & Nicolson books
Nonlinear narrative novels
Postmodern novels